WECU (1570 AM) is a radio station broadcasting a sports format. Licensed to Winterville, North Carolina, United States, it serves the Greenville area.  The station is currently owned by CTC Media Group and operated by New Lite Media.

History
WECU shortly went off the air in November 2012. Later in same month, a new gospel station "The Promise" 1570 and 97.9 FM was heard over the air.  On February 4, 2013 the Yolanda Adams morning was launched on the station airing weekdays from 6 am until 10 am. The station is being managed by Bronson Williams, the creator of Promise 107.3 which aired on WBOB-FM (now WVRA) from July 2007 until January 2012. On October 1, 2014 WECU changed their format to sports, with programming from ESPN Radio.

External links

ECU